Fantastic was a Polish children's television channel owned by Zone Vision. It was launched on 1 November 1999. Daily programming consisted of a twelve-hour block dedicated to Nickelodeon and an additional two-hour block featuring animated shows produced by Gaumont/Xilam.

Initially, the channel showed animated shows and live-action shows with a voice-over. By 2000, all series were dubbed. For a time the station was losing viewers. On 1 July 2001, Zone Vision closed Fantastic channel due to poor performance and low audience reach. Some Nickelodeon cartoons and movies moved into channels like Canal+, MiniMax (now Teletoon+), TVP3, Tele 5, RTL7 (later TVN7), TV4, TVP1, Disney Channel and KidsCo before Nickelodeon Poland was officially launched on July 10, 2008.

Programming

Nickelodeon shows

Animated 
 The Angry Beavers
 The Wild Thornberrys
 Hey Arnold!
 KaBlam!
 Rugrats
 Aaahh!!! Real Monsters
 The Ren & Stimpy Show
 Rocko's Modern Life
 SpongeBob SquarePants

Live Action 
 Kenan & Kel
 Clarissa Explains It All
 The Journey of Allen Strange
 The Adventures of Pete & Pete
 Hey Dude
 Allegra's Window
 Welcome Freshmen

Game Shows 
 Nickelodeon Guts
 Legends of the Hidden Temple

Nick Jr. 
 Little Bear
 Blue's Clues
 Franklin
 Kipper
 Thomas & Friends
 Little Bill
 Dora the Explorer
 Maggie and the Ferocious Beast

Other shows 
 The Magician
 Space Goofs
 Oggy and the Cockroaches

References

External links 
 
 

Defunct television channels in Poland
Television channels and stations established in 1999
Television channels and stations disestablished in 2001
1999 establishments in Poland